Humeral avulsion of the glenohumeral ligament (HAGL) is defined as an avulsion (tearing away) of the inferior glenohumeral ligament from the anatomic neck of the humerus. In other words, it occurs when we have disruption of the ligaments that join the humerus to the glenoid. HAGL tends to occur in 7.5-9.3% of cases of anterior shoulder instability. Making it an uncommon cause of anterior shoulder instability. Avulsion of this ligamentous complex may occur in three sites: glenoid insertion (40%), the midsubstance (35%) and the humeral insertion (25%). Bony humeral avulsion of the glenohumeral ligament (BHAGL) refers  when we have HAGL with bony fracture.

Signs and Symptoms
Signs and symptoms of a dislocation or rotator cuff tear such as:

Significant pain, which can sometimes be felt past the shoulder, along the arm.
Inability to move the arm from its current position, particularly in positions with the arm reaching away from the body and with the top of the arm twisted toward the back.
Numbness of the arm.
Visibly displaced shoulder.  Some dislocations result in the shoulder appearing unusually square.
No bone in the side of the shoulder showing shoulder has become dislocated.

Causes
Most commonly due to anterior shoulder dislocation caused by hyperabduction and external rotation of the arm. Usually in young men who play contact sports (E.g. rugby, football, volleyball, basketball, etc.). Frequent anterior (frontward) subluxation also poses a great risk factor.

Diagnosis
The inferior glenohumeral ligament attaches to the glenoid labrum(cartilage which surrounds the "shoulder socket") at one end, and at the other end attaches to the anatomic neck of the humerus(the section of the humerus which is directly below the head of the humerus which rotates within the "shoulder socket"). In between these two attachment points the ligament droops down to give the appearance of a U, wherein(on the right side of the body), the left end of the U is its attachment to the humerus, and the right end is its attachment to the glenoid labrum. 

Excessive stress on the inferior glenohumeral ligament, often due to physical trauma, can cause the end attached to the humerus to detach and fall down, transforming the U-shaped appearance of the ligament into a J-shaped appearance called the "J" Sign. On the left side of the body—where it is the right side of the ligament which is attached to humerus— the U becomes a reverse "J" Sign. Imaging (MRI) is the best modality for diagnosis where the presence of the "J" sign on an MRI indicates that this detachment has occurred.

Clinical differential diagnosis of anterior shoulder instability include:

Bankart lesions
Anterior labroligamentous periosteal sleeve avulsions
glenolabral articular disruption (GLAD) lesions
HAGL

Treatment
Treatment is surgical reconstruction via arthroscopy.

References

External links
Radiopaedia Homepage
Shoulder Pain Help & Information
Images at Radiology,“J” sign, Arthroscopic image

Injuries of shoulder and upper arm